U-10 may refer to one of the following German submarines:

 , was a Type U 9 submarine launched in 1911 and that served in the First World War until sunk on 30 June 1916
 During the First World War, Germany also had these submarines with similar names:
 , a Type UB I submarine launched in 1915 and scuttled on 5 October 1918
 , a Type UC I submarine launched in 1915 and sunk 21 August 1916
 , a Type IIB submarine that served in the Second World War and was stricken on 1 August 1944
 , a Type 205 submarine of the Bundesmarine that was launched in 1967; sold in 1993; now a museum ship in Wilhelmshaven

U-10 or U-X may also refer to:
 , lead boat of the U-10 class submarines for the Austro-Hungarian Navy

Submarines of Germany